The Jenner is a mountain in Bavaria, Germany. It is part of the Göll massif within the Berchtesgaden Alps. Its summit, accessible from Schönau by cable car (Jennerbahn) since 1953, offers panoramic views to the Watzmann range  and the Königssee below.

Several hiking trails lead to the neighbouring Hohes Brett and Schneibstein peaks, and into the Berchtesgaden National Park area in the south. The mountain is also the site of an Alpine ski resort and a popular destination for ski mountaineers.

Mountains of Bavaria
Berchtesgaden Alps
Mountains of the Alps